The Kinsale Sevens (also known as Heineken Kinsale Sevens, Kinsale Sevens By The Sea) is Ireland and Europe's premier seven-a-side club rugby event. The event takes place across the May Bank Holiday Weekend (Friday to Sunday) at the Kinsale Rugby Football Club, Kinsale, Ireland and sees teams from around the world compete against each other in ladies', men's (junior and senior) and veteran competitions.

Format 
Participants find themselves battling it out over a two-day period (Saturday and Sunday - traditionally, the Friday is dedicated to a fun 10-a-side competition) with the finals of the feature events taking place on the Sunday.

The event is open to everyone and applications to participate can be submitted to the official website.

Notable past winners 
 South Sea Drifters (Fiji)
 Kooga Wailers (Eng)
 Wekas (NZ)
 Marauders (Eng)
 De La Salle Palmerston (Irl)
 Clontarf RFC (Irl)
 Cork Constitution (Irl)
 Garryowen Football Club (Irl)
 Shannon RFC (Irl)
 Gloucester Rugby (Eng)
 Waterpark (Irl)
 Dungannon RFC (Irl)
 Fiji Babaas (Fiji)
 Susie Saloons (Netherlands)
 Seven Minute Abs (Irl)

References

External links 
Kinsale Sevens

Rugby sevens competitions in Europe
Rugby union competitions in Munster
Sport in Kinsale
Rugby sevens in Ireland
International rugby union competitions hosted by Ireland